Jiangsu Lemote Tech Co., Ltd or Lemote is a computer company established as a joint venture between the Jiangsu Menglan Group and the Chinese Institute of Computing Technology, involved in computer hardware and software products, services, and projects.

History

In June 2006, shortly after Institute of Computing Technology of the Chinese Academy of Sciences developed Loongson 2E they need a company to build end product, so the Jiangsu Menglan Group began a joint venture with the Institute of Computing Technology of the Chinese Academy of Sciences. The venture was named Jiangsu Lemote Tech Co., Ltd.

A computer was announced by Fuxin Zhang, an ICT researcher also a Lemote staff, who said the purpose of this project was to "provide everyone with a personal computer".  The device is intended for low income groups and rural area students.

Hardware
Lemote builds small form factor computers including network computers and netbooks with Loongson Processors.

Netbook computers

The Yeeloong netbook computer is intended to be built on free software from the BIOS upwards, and for this reason is used and recommended by the founder of Free Software Foundation, Richard Stallman as of September 2008 and 23 January 2010.

The specifications are:

Loongson 3A laptop

Loongson insiders revealed a new model based on the Loongson 3A quad-core laptop has been developed and was expected to launch in August 2011. With a similar design to the MacBook Pro from Apple Inc., it will carry a Linux operating system by default.

In September 2011, Lemote announced the Yeeloong-8133 13.3" laptop featuring 900 MHz, quad-core Loongson-3A/2GQ CPU.

Desktop computers
Lynloong, all-in-one desktop computer, combined computer and monitor, without keyboard.
Myloong, desktop diskless network computer (NC), without monitor or keyboard.
Fuloong, see below.

Products in development
Hiloong, SOHO and family storage center.

Fuloong 2 series of small desktop computers
The Fuloong 2 series is a desktop computer that costs CN¥1,015, €100, US$131. It ships with two Linux distributions, Debian and Rays Linux, but any other distribution that has a mipsel port can be installed, e.g. Gentoo Linux.

Fuloong 2E

The reference hardware specifications as of 28 October 2006 are:
 Dimensions: 18.8 × 14.5 cm
 CPU: Loongson 2E 64-bit, integrated DDR controller, 64 KiB cache level
 Clock speed: 667 MHz
 Southbridge: VIA VT82C686B
 DDR SDRAM: 256 MiB
 Hard disk: IDE 40–60 GB
 Video card: ATI Radeon 7000M (RV100) 16MB PCI
 Network controller: Realtek 8139D, 10/100 Mbit/s
 USB ports: 4
 Power supply: external 12V 4A DC

Fuloong 2F
The Fuloong 2F computer was released on 30 June 2008, priced at CN¥1,800, about €163, $257.

The specifications are:
 Dimensions: 19 × 14.5 × 3.7 cm
 CPU: Loongson 2F, integrated DDR2 controller
 Clock speed: 1 GHz
 Southbridge: AMD CS5536
 DDR2 SDRAM: 512MB
 Hard disk: IDE 120 GB
 Video card: XGA V2, 32MB video RAM, with VGA, DVI and S-video ports
 Network controller: Ethernet, Realtek RTL 8110SC, 1000Mbit/s
 USB ports: 2.0, 4
 Infrared receiver
 Power supply: external 12 V power adapter
 Operating system: Xinhua Hualay Rays 2.0, which is a Linux distribution that supports MIPS architecture. Fuloong 2F also works well with other Linux distributions,  OpenBSD, and NetBSD.

Fuloong Mini-PC 

The specifications are:

Software
Lemote has participated in development and MIPS-porting of Debian GNU/Linux, eCos, MicroC/OS-II, VxWorks, Microsoft Windows CE, Java, OpenOffice.org and Yongzhong Office by Wuxi Yongzhong Tech Co. It also develops a Loongson processor simulator based on GXemul. In part to its ability to run only libre software, without proprietary binary blobs, Richard Stallman famously used the Lemote Yeeloong.

See also
 OLPC XO-1, also called the $100 Laptop project
 Classmate PC, a low cost machine developed by Intel
 Sinomanic Tianhua GX-1C, part of a line of affordable machines developed by Sinomanic in China
 Simputer, an earlier project to construct cheap handheld computers in India
 VIA pc-1 Initiative, a project of VIA Technologies to help bridge the digital divide

References

External links
  (in Chinese, defunct as of January 2019)
 
 .

News articles (by date)
 .
 .

Chinese brands
Netbook manufacturers
Computer hardware companies
Linux-based devices
Appropriate technology
Information and communication technologies in Asia
Mobile computers
Electronics companies of China
Computer companies established in 2006
Manufacturing companies based in Suzhou
Changshu
Chinese companies established in 2006